William Everett Chipman (September 27, 1822 – September 30, 1893) was a member of the Wisconsin State Senate.

Chipman was born in Brockville, Canada and lived there until he was 12. He moved to Cicero, Onondaga County, New York and then to Burlington, Wisconsin around 1846. After brief stays in California and Illinois, Chipman settled in Wisconsin after 1864. He died near Burlington, Wisconsin.

Career
Chipman was a member of the Senate from 1879 to 1880. He was a Republican.

References

People from Brockville
Pre-Confederation Canadian emigrants to the United States
People from Burlington, Wisconsin
Republican Party Wisconsin state senators
1822 births
1893 deaths
19th-century American politicians